Open Season 2 is a 2008 American computer-animated comedy film and the sequel to the 2006 film Open Season, produced by Sony Pictures Animation. It was directed by Matthew O'Callaghan, co-directed by Todd Wilderman, and produced by Kirk Bodyfelt and Matthew O'Callaghan. It was released theatrically in other countries starting in South Africa on September 24, 2008, and direct-to-video in the United States on January 27, 2009. The film received mixed reviews and grossed $8.7 million worldwide.

Plot

In the spring, Elliot has grown giant new antlers and is about to marry Giselle. However, Elliot's new antlers are cracked off in an accident, which upsets him. Believing that his cracked antlers are a sign of bad luck and after hearing words being spoken by Ian during the wedding ceremony, Elliot begins to have second thoughts. Meanwhile, Mr. Weenie finds a dog biscuit trail that his previous owners left behind and follows it. At the climax of the wedding, Elliot witnesses Mr. Weenie being taken away by his old owners, Bob and Bobbie. Elliot tells an exaggerated story to the other forest animals about Bobbie torturing Mr. Weenie (made possible by his misinterpretation of Bobbie's excessive affections toward Mr. Weenie) and decides to make a rescue mission to save him while also using it to avoid marrying Giselle until his giant antlers grow back. Boog, Elliot, Giselle, McSquizzy, Buddy, Serge and Deni set off on a rescue mission under Boog's lead.

Meanwhile, the pets of Bob and Bobbie's friends - on their way to Pet Paradiso, a resort for humans and their pets - meet at a rest stop. There is Fifi, a toy poodle and his basset hound companion Roberto, two cats named Stanley and Roger, and two Southern dogs named Rufus and Charlene. Fifi discusses his hatred for wild animals, describing how he claims they got him shocked by a bug zapper. He then tries to maul a nearby rabbit, until he's stopped by his owner. Meanwhile, the wilds find Weenie, much to Elliot's dismay. They try to free him while his owners stop at a gas station. They free him from his chains, but because of Elliot's impulsiveness and clumsiness, they accidentally leave him stuck in the RV along with Buddy. Elliot and Giselle have an argument, and eventually leave Elliot to search for Mr. Weenie himself, while Serge and Deni fly to look for him.

The owners reach the pet camp with Mr. Weenie and Buddy. The other pets meet with Weenie, and Fifi tries to revert Weenie back into his pet state, but Weenie resists. Buddy helps Weenie escape and Buddy tries to free Weenie from his shock collar. During the chase, Fifi gets shocked by the collar and gets the fur on his forehead burned, causing him to lose most of his sanity and vow revenge.

Meanwhile, Serge and Deni return and explain they found Weenie and Buddy at a pet camp, unaware that the two have already escaped. Boog and the others set up camp, and Boog fails to convince Giselle that Elliot is a good person and that they belong together. The wilds realize that they have gone to Pet Paradiso. Weenie and Buddy find Elliot in the woods and convince him to go to Pet Paradiso to save his friends.

The wilds try to sneak into Pet Paradiso by disguising themselves as pets, with Giselle as a dalmatian and McSquizzy as a chihuahua. Boog attempts to sneak in as a cat, but proves to be too large to pass off as one. He then changes his disguise to a sheepdog. After Elliot, Mr. Weenie, and Buddy meet up with Boog, Elliot also disguises himself as Boog's human owner and they sneak in. Giselle and McSquizzy walk around Pet Paradiso looking for Mr. Weenie, but their cover is blown and are captured by Fifi and the other pets and taken to their secret lair beneath the resort's waterslide. Elliot, Buddy and Mr. Weenie attempt to go inside to save Giselle and McSquizzy, but Mr. Weenie, missing being a pet again, goes to play on the waterslide, leaving the rest except Boog to be captured by Fifi, while Boog tries to catch Mr. Weenie.

Fifi tries to kill them all with a pile of shock collars. As Boog tries to stop Mr. Weenie from going down the waterslide, his cover is blown and security attempts to tranquilize him. Before Fifi shocks the wilds into submission, Elliot, having learned to trust himself more than his antlers, tries to profess his love for Giselle, only to be berated by her for leaving her at the altar and using Mr. Weenie's "kidnapping" as an excuse. As Fifi is about to kill them, Boog enters the lair via the water slide and the liquid flushes everyone out.

A battle between the wilds and pets ensues, with the Pet Paradiso security focused on tranquilizing the wilds. While Boog tricks security into tranquilizing themselves, Elliot saves Giselle, accidentally placing all the shock collars on himself. He wrestles Fifi in the pool for the shock collar remote; Fifi eventually grabs the remote and activates the collars, only to realize that Elliot has attached the collars to him. Fifi survives the electrocution but loses all his fur, humiliating him further. The pets and the wilds settle their differences and decide to become friends. Mr. Weenie, wanting to be a pet again, decides to join the pets and returns to his owners in rejoice. Returning to the woods, Elliot finally professes his true feelings for Giselle, and they get married.

Cast
Joel McHale as Elliot, a mule deer who is Boog's best friend and was supposed to marry Giselle, but abandoned her due to new emotions.
Mike Epps as Boog, a grizzly bear who is Elliot's best friend and leads the rescue mission to save Mr. Weenie.
Cody Cameron as Mr. Weenie, a German dachshund who was captured by Fifi and the pets, causing Boog, Elliot, and the other wilds to rescue him.
Georgia Engel as Bobbie, Mr. Weenie's woman owner
Jane Krakowski as Giselle, Elliot's fiancée who is scared of getting married.
Billy Connolly as McSquizzy, a Scottish squirrel who joins in the mission to save Weenie.
Crispin Glover as Fifi, an ill-tempered toy poodle who is often annoyed by his companion, Roberto. Fifi has a deep hatred over wild animals and slowly begins to lose his sanity after his forehead gets burned during a chase.
Maddie Taylor as Deni/Buddy/Ian. Except for Ian, they join in the mission to save Mr. Weenie.
Steve Schirripa as Roberto, Fifi's dim-witted friend who usually annoys him.
Fred Stoller as Stanley, a cat who is constantly annoyed by Roger.
Sean Mullen as Roger, an intellectually disabled cat who often annoys his best friend Stanley.
Diedrich Bader as Rufus, a Southern dog who is Charlene's boyfriend.
Olivia Hack as Charlene, a Southern dog who is Rufus' girlfriend.

Production
Sony announced a sequel to Open Season in September 2007. Although the original grossed $85.1 million in the United States and $115.7 million in foreign countries, Sony felt the film performed much better on DVD, thus, making a direct-to-DVD sequel. Sony Pictures Digital president said that "the studio will keep Open Season 2's costs low by utilizing Imageworks' satellite facilities in India and New Mexico".

Release
Although Open Season 2 was released direct-to-video in the United States and the United Kingdom, it was released theatrically in some countries. In South Africa on its opening day, the film grossed $84,244 from 26 screens with an $2,081 average. In Russia, it opened with $2,835,600 from 360 screens with a $7,877 average. In Poland, it opened with $194,339 from 75 screens with an $2,591 average. In total, the film grossed $8,716,950.

Theatrical releases:
South Africa - September 24, 2008
Russia - October 16, 2008
Croatia - November 6, 2008
United Arab Emirates - November 13, 2008
Czech Republic - December 18, 2008
Slovakia - December 18, 2008
Lebanon - December 18, 2008
Turkey - January 16, 2009
Poland - January 23, 2009
Iceland - January 30, 2009
South Korea - March 12, 2009

Reception
Critic at DVD Verdict claimed, "Open Season 2 is no classic (neither was the original), but it's a competent check-your-brain-at-the-door comedy for children of all ages. The animation and storytelling may not stack up against Pixar's (whose does?), but the flick offers something that Pixar movies generally don't: old cartoon slapstick and sight gags in the mold of Bugs Bunny".

Home media
Open Season 2 was released on DVD, Blu-ray Disc and PSP UMD on January 27, 2009.

Sequels

The sequel Open Season 3 premiered in theaters in Russia on October 21, 2010 and was released on DVD and Blu-ray in United States on January 25, 2011. Open Season: Scared Silly premiered in theaters in Turkey on December 18, 2015, and was released on DVD and Blu-ray in the United States and Canada on March 8, 2016. It serves as a standalone sequel, acknowledging the events of the original movie but not those of the second and third.

References

External links

 
 
 
 
 
 

2008 films
2008 computer-animated films
2008 direct-to-video films
2000s American animated films
2000s buddy comedy films
American children's animated comedy films
American computer-animated films
American sequel films
American buddy comedy films
Animated buddy films
Animated films about animals
Direct-to-video sequel films
Films scored by Ramin Djawadi
Films directed by Matthew O'Callaghan
Open Season (franchise)
Reel FX Creative Studios films
Sony Pictures Animation films
Sony Pictures direct-to-video films
2000s English-language films